St-y-Nyll is a large detached house near the village of St. Brides-super-Ely in the Vale of Glamorgan.

It was built in 1924 by the Welsh architect Percy Thomas in the Neo-Georgian style. A Tudor mansion dating from the 1480s had previously stood on the site. It has been listed Grade II by Cadw since June 1977. It was put up for sale in 2000 for £715,000 and was described as having  of grounds. The interior is noted for its plaster cornices, parquet floors, and original fireplaces dating from the 17th century, the Georgian period, and in the style of Robert Adam. It sold for £1.5 million in June 2020.

References

Grade II listed buildings in the Vale of Glamorgan
Grade II listed houses in Wales
Houses completed in 1924
Percy Thomas buildings
Georgian Revival architecture in the United Kingdom